Dark Star on the Right Horn of the Crescent Moon is the third and final studio album by Ukrainian black metal band Blood of Kingu. It was released on August 28, 2014, under Season of Mist.

Track listing

References

2014 albums
Blood of Kingu albums